Arayat may refer to:
Arayat, Pampanga, a municipality in the Philippines
Japanese patrol boat No. 105 (1931) formerly the Arayat, a Philippine Commonwealth customs inspection cutter sunk and rebuilt by the Imperial Japanese Navy in 1942
Mount Arayat, a mountain in the Philippines
USS Arayat (IX-134), a petroleum tanker built in 1918